His Official Fiancée is a lost 1919 American silent comedy film directed by Robert G. Vignola and written by Edith M. Kennedy and Berta Ruck. The film stars Vivian Martin, Forrest Stanley, Vera Sisson, Hugh Huntley, Mollie McConnell, Kathryn Sohn and Tom Ricketts. The film was released on October 16, 1919, by Paramount Pictures.

Plot

Cast
Vivian Martin as Monica Trant
Forrest Stanley as Wililam 'Still' Waters
Vera Sisson as Cicely Harradine
Hugh Huntley as Sydney Vandeleur
Mollie McConnell as Mrs. Waters
Kathryn Sohn as Theo Waters
Tom Ricketts as Major Montressor
Robert Bolder as Uncle Albert Waters 
James Neill as Mr. Dundonald
Katherine Van Buren as Odette Charrier
Virginia Foltz as Miss Robinson

References

External links 

 

1919 films
1910s English-language films
Silent American comedy films
1919 comedy films
Paramount Pictures films
Films directed by Robert G. Vignola
American black-and-white films
Lost American films
American silent feature films
Films set in London
1919 lost films
Lost comedy films
1910s American films